Pavlos Argyriadis (birth name: Panagiotis Argyriadis, August 14, 1849, Kastoria - November 19, 1901, Paris) was a Greek lawyer, journalist and anarchist and socialist intellectual that was active in France during the late 19th century.

Biography 
He was born in Kastoria in 1849, probably in a wealthy family. He completed his high school studies in Istanbul and then studied law in Paris, where he became a lawyer after becoming a French citizen. Argyriadis was one of the few Greek internationalists of that time who had a notable connection or participation in important revolutionary events in Europe including the Paris Commune in 1871. In Paris he defended accused workers and journalists. Among others, he had political relations with Platon Drakoulis and Stavros Kallergis. In 1889 he was a member of the Central Committee of the Socialist Revolutionary Party of France.

Publications 

His works include the following brochures:

 Concentration capitaliste, trusts et accaparements. Paris: edition of the periodical La Question sociale, 1896. Off print from Almanach de la Question sociale of 1896
 Solution de la Question d'Orient. La Confédération balkanique, compte rendu de la conférence tenue au Grand-Orient de France sur cette question et la Macédoine, relation sur ce pays (together with Paul Lafargue). Paris: edition of the periodical La Question sociale, 1896. Off print from Almanach de la Question sociale of 1896
 Une cause célèbre. Affaire Souhain. Une mère qui, poussée par la misère étrangle ses enfants. Plaidorie. Paris: edition of the periodical La Question sociale, 1895
 La crise du socialisme en Allemagne. Paris, 1891
 La femme et le socialisme, traduction analytique de l'ouvrage de Bebel. Paris: edition of the periodical La Question sociale (firstly published in the periodical La Revue socialiste in 1889)
 Essai sur le socialisme scientifique: critique économique de la production capitaliste. Paris: edition of the periodical La Question sociale, 1890
 Le poète socialiste Eugène Pottier, ancien membre de la Commune. Paris: edition of the periodical La Question sociale, 1888
 La peine de mort, considérée aux point de vue philosophique, moral, légal et pratique chez Leroux. Paris, 1875

, and several articles in the periodicals La Question sociale, Almanach de la Question sociale et de la libre penseé, La Revue socialiste.

References 

Greek anarchists
French socialists
French journalists
Greek journalists
Greek socialists
French anarchists
Greek lawyers
French lawyers
People from Kastoria